Pablo Elisii (born 14 October 1971) is an Argentine judoka. He competed in the men's middleweight event at the 1996 Summer Olympics.

References

External links
 

1971 births
Living people
Argentine male judoka
Olympic judoka of Argentina
Judoka at the 1996 Summer Olympics
Place of birth missing (living people)
Pan American Games medalists in judo
Pan American Games bronze medalists for Argentina
Judoka at the 1995 Pan American Games
20th-century Argentine people
21st-century Argentine people